Muvattupuzha taluk is part of the Ernakulam district in the state of Kerala, India. This taluk was formed during the period of Marthanda Varma. It is a revenue division for ease of administration purposes, and is headquartered in Muvattupuzha. Most government offices are in the Mini Civil Station at Vazhappilly. Muvattupuzha taluk consists of  
 Muvattupuzha municipality 
 Piravom municipality 
 Koothattukulam municipality 
and the following panchayaths.
 Avoly
 Arakuzha
 Paipra
 Kalloorkad
 Ayavana
 Manjalloor
 Marady
 Valakom
 Maneed
 Elanji
 Thirumarady
 Palakkuzha
 Pampakuda
 Ramamangalam

Muvattupuzha taluka consists of highland and midland regions including large rubber plantations and pineapple fields. It has a predominantly agrarian economy. The population of Muvattupuzha taluk according to 2001 Census of India is 324644. It borders with Kothamangalam taluk on the North, Thodupuzha taluk of Idukki District on the East, Vaikom and Meenachil taluks of Kottayam District on the South and Kunnathunad taluk on the West.

The main towns in Muvattupuzha taluk are:

 Muvattupuzha
 Piravom
 Koothattukulam
 Vazhakulam
 Pezhakkappilly
 Elanji

References

See also
 https://web.archive.org/web/20110815193833/http://ernakulam.gov.in/tlk_pop.htm
 http://www.muvattupuzhamunicipality.in/about

Geography of Ernakulam district
Taluks of Kerala
Neighbourhoods in Kochi
Muvattupuzha